Sikkim State Day is celebrated on May 16, to commemorate the formation of Sikkim as the 22nd state of India Union, in 1975.

References

Indian state foundation days

May observances
Parades in India
Culture of Sikkim